Bruno Hofstätter (born 14 May 1963) is an Austrian biathlete. He competed at the 1988 Winter Olympics and the 1992 Winter Olympics.

References

External links
 

1963 births
Living people
Austrian male biathletes
Olympic biathletes of Austria
Biathletes at the 1988 Winter Olympics
Biathletes at the 1992 Winter Olympics
People from Lienz
Sportspeople from Tyrol (state)